Marcin Nowak (born 18 August 1995) is a Polish speedway rider. He currently rides in the second tier of British Speedway, for the Glasgow Tigers in the SGB Championship.

Speedway career
Nowak rode in his native Poland for Grudziądz from 2016 to 2017. In 2021, Nowak signed his first British team contract when he joined the Glasgow Tigers for the SGB Championship 2021. In 2022, he rode for Lodz in Poland and Piraterna in Sweden. He also competed in the 2022 Speedway European Championship.

In 2023, he re-signed for Glasgow for the SGB Championship 2023.

References 

1995 births
Living people
Polish speedway riders
Glasgow Tigers riders